Knipphals is a German surname. Notable people with the surname include:

Jens Knipphals (born 1958), West German long jumper
Sven Knipphals (born 1985), German sprinter

German-language surnames